Otto Dickel (5 June 1880 in Darmstadt – 15 June 1944 in Undingen) was the founder of the fascist Völkisch Work Community that existed in Germany during the Weimar Republic era. In 1921, Dickel participated in negotiations with the Nazi Party under the leadership of Anton Drexler, who attempted to negotiate with Dickel to merge the Volkish Work Community with the Nazi Party and the German Social Party. However such plans were scrapped when Adolf Hitler, then only a member of the Nazi party, vehemently rejected the plan and threatened to resign from the NSDAP if the Nazis agreed to the merger. Hitler personally accused Dickel of being an enemy of National Socialism. Over time, Dickel would gradually drift away from his economic views and by the 1930s had become a proponent of laissez-faire capitalism.

Otto Dickel spoke of the need for the creation of a Greater German nation, the revival of the German nation as well as German and Western culture and the need to abandon what he saw as a cowardly contemporary culture.

References

Weimar Republic politicians
1880 births
1944 deaths
German fascists
Politicians from Darmstadt